The Bahnaric languages are a group of about thirty Austroasiatic languages spoken by about 700,000 people in Vietnam, Cambodia, and Laos. Paul Sidwell notes that Austroasiatic/Mon–Khmer languages are lexically more similar to Bahnaric and Katuic languages the closer they are geographically, independently of which branch of the family they belong to, but that Bahnaric and Katuic do not have any shared innovations that would suggest that together they form a branch of the Austroasiatic family, rather forming separate branches.

Internal controversy
Internal diversity suggests that the family broke up about 3,000 years ago. North Bahnaric is characterized by a register contrast between breathy and modal voice, which in Sedang has tensed to become modal–creaky voice.

Lamam is a clan name of the neighboring Tampuon and Kaco’.

Sidwell (2009) tentatively classifies the Bahnaric languages into four branches, with Cua (Kor) classified independently as East Bahnaric.

Unclassified Bahnaric languages of Cambodia include Mel, Khaonh, Ra’ong, and Thmon.

Bahnaric
West Bahnaric
Jru' (Laven), Juk, Su'
Nyaheun
Oi, The, Sok, Sapuan, Cheng
Brao, Laveh, Krung, Kravet
Central Bahnaric
Taliang (Kasseng)
Alak
Central South
Tampuon
Bahnar
South Bahnaric
Chrau
Sre
Stieng
Mnong
North Bahnaric
Halang, Kayong
Jeh
Kotau
Tadrah, Modrah
Sedang
Hrê
Monom (Bonam)
Rengao
Kaco’, Ramam
East Bahnaric
Cua (Kor)

North Bahnaric
North Bahnaric consists of a dialect chain spoken to the north of the Chamic languages. Sedang and Hre have the most speakers, each with about 100,000.

Other Northern Bahnaric languages, too poorly known to classify further, are Duan and Katua.

West Bahnaric
West Bahnaric is a dialect chain to the west of North Bahnaric, Unlike the other Bahnaric languages to the east, the West Bahnaric languages were under Khmer rather than Chamic influence, and also by the Katuic languages as part of a Katuic-West Bahnaric sprachbund (Sidwell 2003).
West Bahnaric
Brao–Kavet: Lave (Brao), Kru'ng, Kravet
Laven, Sou [split?]
Nyaheun
Oi–The: Jeng; Oy, Sok, Sapuan, The

Sidwell (2003) proposes the following West Bahnaric groupings, with Lavi branching off first, Jru'/Laven, Su', and Juk as forming a branch that had branched off secondarily, and the rest within a core group. Jru' and Brao each have tens of thousands of speakers, while the other languages have no more than 1,000 speakers each.

West Bahnaric
Lavi
(branch)
Jru'/Laven, Su', Juk
(branch)
Nyaheun
Sapuan
Oi/Sok/Cheng
Laveh/Brao

Central Bahnaric
Central Bahnaric is a language family divided by the Chamic languages, Bahnar, Mnong, and Sre (Koho) each have over 100,000 speakers.
Central Bahnaric
Alak
Cua
Taliang (Kassang)
Central South: to the southwest of Chamic:
Tampuon
Bahnar
South Bahnaric
Stieng–Chrau: Chrau, Stieng (Bulo, Budeh)
Sre–Mnong: Koho, Mnong

Kassang is a Bahnaric language (Sidwell 2003), though Ethnologue lists it as Katuic.

Sidwell (2002, quoted in Sidwell 2003) gives the following classification for the Central Bahnaric languages. Note that Sidwell (2009) later classifies Cua as an independent branch, namely East Bahnaric.

Central Bahnaric
North Central
Alak (Halak)
West Central
Kasseng/Taliang
Yaeh
East Central
Cua
South Central
Tampuon
Bahnar
South Bahnaric
Chrau
Koho
Ma'
Stieng
Mnong

Language diagrams
North Bahnaric (2022)

Lexical innovations
Paul Sidwell (2015:183) lists the following Bahnaric lexical innovations that had replaced original Proto-Austroasiatic forms.

References

Further reading
Cheeseman, Nathaniel; Herington, Jennifer; Sidwell, Paul (2013). Bahnaric Bahnaric linguistic bibliography with selected annotations. Mon-Khmer Studies vol. 42 Mahidol University and SIL International.
Sidwell, Paul (2003). A Handbook of comparative Bahnaric, Vol. 1: West Bahnaric. Pacific Linguistics, 551. Canberra: Research School of Pacific and Asian Studies, Australian National University.
Jacq, P., & Sidewell, P. (2000). A comparative West Bahnaric dictionary. Languages of the world, 21. München: LINCOM Europa. 
 Sidwell, Paul. (2002). Genetic Classification of the Bahnaric Languages: a comprehensive review. Mon-Khmer Studies, Vol. 32. Mahidol University, Thailand.
Sidwell, Paul (2000). Proto South Bahnaric: a reconstruction of a Mon–Khmer language of Indo-China. Pacific Linguistics, 501. Canberra: Research School of Pacific and Asian Studies, Australian National University. 
Smith, K. D. (1972). A phonological reconstruction of Proto-North-Bahnaric. Language data: Asian-Pacific series, no. 2. Santa Ana, Calif: Summer Institute of Linguistics.

External links
SEALang SALA provisional classification of Mon–Khmer
Bahnaric languages (2003)
http://projekt.ht.lu.se/rwaai RWAAI (Repository and Workspace for Austroasiatic Intangible Heritage)
http://hdl.handle.net/10050/00-0000-0000-0003-6711-8@view Bahnaric languages in RWAAI Digital Archive

 
Languages of Cambodia
Languages of Laos
Languages of Vietnam